Puram (Lit. exterior) is one of two genres of Classical Tamil poetry. The concept of life style of human beings falls in two categories: personal and public. The genre dealing with poems about love affairs is called Akam (அகம்) while the other genre, called puram, concerns many subjects such as wars, kings, poets and personal virtues, besides others.

Tolkāppiyam, the earliest work of Tamil grammar and literature available in Tamil, divides each genre into seven strands (Thinai) comparing and connecting the one in personal with the other in public life of style. Another work that belongs to a period of a thousand years later, Purapporul Venpamalai, divides the puram concept into twelve according to its view, without concerning the other part life-style.

The genre of puram concept speaks on the excellency of life-style of different people. As the kings are famous, their life-styles of war and gifts are spoken in plenty. Unlike Puram, the personal name of a person will never be identified in Akam concept of literature of poem, as it is common all. Puram leads to consideration as a historical record by Tamil literary scholars as it has details such as names of kings, poets, and places.

See also 
 Sangam literature

References

Further reading

External links 
 Eight Anthologies: 'Puram' Poetry

Tamil poetics
Sangam literature